The women's javelin throw event at the 2019 European Games in Minsk took place on 23 June. The winners in this discipline were determined during the qualifications for Dynamic New Athletics.

Results

References

Women's javelin throw